Hassayampa River Canyon Wilderness is an 11,840 acre (4,790 ha) wilderness area located in the U.S. state of Arizona. It lies north east of Wickenburg. The wilderness area was created in 1990 and is administered by the Bureau of Land Management. The Yavapai word for the Hassayampa River is 'Hasyambo, meaning "the water disappears".

See also
 Wilderness Act
 List of U.S. Wilderness Areas
 List of Arizona Wilderness Areas

External links
 Hassayampa River Canyon Wilderness – Wilderness.net

Wilderness areas of Arizona
Protected areas of Yavapai County, Arizona
Bureau of Land Management areas in Arizona